was a feudal domain under the Tokugawa shogunate of Edo period Japan, located in Kōzuke Province (modern-day Gunma Prefecture), Japan. It was centered on Numata Castle in what is now the city of Numata, Gunma.

History
Following the Battle of Odawara in 1590, Toyotomi Hideyoshi awarded a 27,000 koku area of Numata to Sanada Masayuki. However, Yukimasa was based at Ueda Castle in Shinano Province, and thus entrusted the lands to his son, Sanada Nobuyuki. In the subsequent conflict between the Toyotomi and Tokugawa, the Sanada clan hedged its bets with Sanada Nobuyuki siding with Tokugawa Ieyasu and fighting against his brother, Sanada Yukimura at the Battle of Sekigahara. As a reward for his services, Sanada Nobuyuki was subsequently confirmed by the Tokugawa shogunate in 1600 as daimyō over the combined Ueda and Numata territories and his revenues were increased to 95,000 koku. In 1616, Nobuyuki relocated from Numata to Ueda, entrusting Numata to his son, Sanada Nobuyoshi, but Numata was not officially recognized as a separate domain until 1656. The final Sanada daimyō, Sanada Nobutoshi, profited tremendously by under-representing his income to the shogunate and with the lumber trade. This enabled him to rebuild Numata Castle on a large scale with a 5-story donjon, and rebuilt the clan's residences in Edo on a large scale. The financial irregularities were eventually discovered, and the shogunate seized the domain in 1681.

In 1703, the domain was revived when a branch of the Honda clan was transferred from Shimosa Province, and ruled for three generations until they were transferred to Tanaka Domain in Suruga Province in 1730. In 1732, a branch of the Kuroda clan was transferred from Hitachi Province to Numata, and ruled over two generations to 1742.
The Kuroda clan was replaced by Toki Yoritoshi in 1742, formerly from Tanaka Domain and a former rōjū, and the Toki clan would continue to rule Numata to the Meiji Restoration. During the Boshin War, the final daimyō, Toki Yorioki sided with the imperial forces and participated in the Battle of Aizu.

After the end of the conflict, with the abolition of the han system in July 1871, Numata Domain became "Numata Prefecture", which later became part of Gunma Prefecture.

The domain had a population of 47,177 people in 13,715 households per a census in 1681.

Holdings at the end of the Edo period
As with most domains in the han system, Numata Domain consisted of several discontinuous territories calculated to provide the assigned kokudaka, based on periodic cadastral surveys and projected agricultural yields.

Kōzuke Province
5 villages in Gunma District
50 villages in Tone District
Kawachi Province
5 villages in Wakae District
5 villages in Shiki District
Mimasaka Province
6 villages in Shōboku District
51 villages in Aida District
3 villages in Shōnan District

List of rulers (before become domain)
 Sanada Yukiyoshi
 Sanada Yukitaka (r.?-1574)
 Sanada Nobutsuna (r.1574-1575)
 Sanada Masayuki (r.1575-1590)
 Hojo Ujinao (r.1590-1590)
 Sanada Masayuki (r.1590-1600)
 Sanada Nobuyuki (r.1600-1616)
 Sanada Nobuyoshi (r.1616-1634)
 Sanada Nobumasa (r.1634-1656)

List of daimyō

References

External links
  Numata on "Edo 300 HTML"

Notes

Domains of Japan
1656 establishments in Japan
States and territories established in 1656
1871 disestablishments in Japan
States and territories disestablished in 1871
Kōzuke Province
History of Gunma Prefecture